Etesiolaus pinheyi is a butterfly in the family Lycaenidae. It is found in north-eastern Tanzania.

References

Endemic fauna of Tanzania
Butterflies described in 1986
Iolaini